Callum Joshua Davies (born 8 February 1993) is an English professional footballer who plays as a defender for Folkestone Invicta.

Club career

Gillingham
Davies started his career as a trainee with Gillingham, having captained the youth team and made a number of appearances in the reserve team. He made his debut on 13 November 2010, for Gillingham in their 3–1 home defeat to Crewe Alexandra in League Two. Davies was sent-off in the 28th minute after a professional foul on Clayton Donaldson. Gillingham manager, Andy Hessenthaler said he was in tears after being sent-off and stated "It was never a sending off. It was a very harsh decision. I am absolutely devastated for him.

Loan spells
In January 2011, Davies joined Conference South side Lewes on a one-month loan. On 29 January 2011, Davies made his Lewes debut in a 0–0 draw against St Albans City, playing the full 90 minutes. Davies went on to make nine more league appearances before returning to Gillingham.

On 25 October 2011, Davies joined Thurrock on a one-month loan. On the same day, Davies made his Thurrock debut in a 3–0 home defeat to Dartford, in which he played the full 90 minutes.

On 27 March 2014, Davies joined Dover Athletic on loan for the remainder of the 2013/14 campaign. On 5 April 2014, Davies made his Dover Athletic debut in a 2–2 draw with Bishop's Stortford, playing the full 90 minutes. On 21 April 2014, Davies scored his first professional goal in a 1–1 home draw against Whitehawk, in which he claimed the equalizer for Dover Athletic after Jake Robinson put the visitors ahead.

On 27 November 2014, Davies re-joined Dover Athletic on loan until January 2015.

On 15 August 2015, Davies joined National League side Bromley on a one-month loan. On the same day, Davies made his Bromley debut in a 4–1 defeat to Grimsby Town, in which he netted a consolation goal for Bromley.

On 22 September 2015, after struggling to make an impression at Bromley, Davies joined Eastleigh on a one-month loan. On the same day, Davies made his only Eastleigh appearance in a 5–2 defeat to former club Dover Athletic.

Maidstone United
On 23 December 2015, after a five-year senior spell with Gillingham, Davies joined National League South side Maidstone United on an 18-month deal. On 2 January 2016, Davies made his Maidstone United debut in a 2–1 victory over Margate, playing the full 90 minutes. On 27 February 2016, Davies scored his first Maidstone United goal in a 2–1 defeat against Havant & Waterlooville.

On 19 August 2016, Davies joined Folkestone Invicta on a three-month loan, which was then made permanent upon its conclusion.

Folkestone Invicta
Davies has gone on to become  Folkestone Invicta captain and is a regular in the side

Career statistics

References

External links
Gillingham profile

1993 births
People from Sittingbourne
Living people
Association football defenders
English footballers
Gillingham F.C. players
Lewes F.C. players
Thurrock F.C. players
Dover Athletic F.C. players
Bromley F.C. players
Eastleigh F.C. players
Maidstone United F.C. players
English Football League players
National League (English football) players